Art rock is a subgenre of rock music that generally reflects a challenging or avant-garde approach to rock, or which makes use of modernist, experimental, or unconventional elements. Art rock aspires to elevate rock from entertainment to an artistic statement, opting for a more experimental and conceptual outlook on music. Influences may be drawn from genres such as experimental music, avant-garde music, classical music, and jazz.

Its music was created with the intention of listening and contemplation rather than for dancing, and is often distinguished by the use of electronic effects and easy listening textures far removed from the propulsive rhythms of early rock. The term may sometimes be used interchangeably with "progressive rock", though the latter is instead characterized in particular by its employment of classically trained instrumental technique and symphonic textures.

The genre's greatest level of popularity was in the early 1970s through British artists. The music, as well as the theatrical nature of performances associated with the genre, was able to appeal to artistically inclined adolescents and younger adults, especially due to its virtuosity and musical/lyrical complexity. Art rock is most associated with a certain period of rock music, beginning in 1966–67 and ending with the arrival of punk rock in the mid-1970s.  After, the genre would be infused within later popular music genres of the 1970s–90s.

Definitions

Critic John Rockwell says that art rock is one of rock's most wide-ranging and eclectic genres with its overt sense of creative detachment, classical music pretensions, and experimental, avant-garde proclivities.  In the rock music of the 1970s, the "art" descriptor was generally understood to mean "aggressively avant-garde" or "pretentiously progressive". "Art rock" is often used synonymously with progressive rock. Historically, the term has been used to describe at least two related, but distinct, types of rock music. The first is progressive rock, while the second usage refers to groups who rejected psychedelia and the hippie counterculture in favor of a modernist, avant-garde approach defined by the Velvet Underground. Essayist Ellen Willis compared these two types:

Art rock emphasizes Romantic and autonomous traditions, in distinction to the aesthetic of the everyday and the disposable embodied by art pop. Larry Starr and Christopher Waterman's American Popular Music defines art rock as a "form of rock music that blended elements of rock and European classical music", citing the English rock bands King Crimson, Emerson, Lake & Palmer, and Pink Floyd as examples. Common characteristics include album-oriented music divided into compositions rather than songs, with usually complicated and long instrumental sections and symphonic orchestration. Its music was traditionally used within the context of concept records, and its lyrical themes tended to be "imaginative" and politically oriented.

Differences have been identified between art rock and progressive rock, with art rock emphasizing avant-garde or experimental influences and "novel sonic structure", while progressive rock has been characterized as putting a greater emphasis on classically trained instrumental technique, literary content, and symphonic features. Compared to progressive rock, art rock is "more challenging, noisy and unconventional" and "less classically influenced", with more of an emphasis on avant-garde music. Similarities are that they both describe a mostly British attempt to elevate rock music to new levels of artistic credibility, and became the instrumental analog to concept albums and rock operas, which were typically more vocal oriented.

Art rock can also refer to either classically driven rock, or to a progressive rock-folk fusion. Bruce Eder's essay The Early History of Art-Rock/Prog Rock states that "'progressive rock,' also sometimes known as 'art rock,' or 'classical rock'" is music in which the "bands [are] playing suites, not songs; borrowing riffs from Bach, Beethoven, and Wagner instead of Chuck Berry and Bo Diddley; and using language closer to William Blake or T. S. Eliot than to Carl Perkins or Willie Dixon."

History

1960s

Background

The boundaries between art and pop music became increasingly blurred throughout the second half of the 20th century. The first usage of the term "art rock", according to Merriam-Webster Online Dictionary, was in 1968. As pop music's dominant format transitioned from singles to albums, many rock bands created works that aspired to make grand artistic statements, where art rock would flourish. As it progressed in the late 1960s – in tandem with the development of progressive rock – art rock acquired notoriety alongside experimental rock.

Proponents

The earliest figure of art rock has been assumed to be record producer and songwriter Phil Spector, who became known as an auteur for his Wall of Sound productions that aspired to a "classical grandiosity". According to biographer Richard Williams: "[Spector] created a new concept: the producer as overall director of the creative process, from beginning to end. He took control of everything, he picked the artists, wrote or chose the material, supervised the arrangements, told the singers how to phrase, masterminded all phases of the recording process with the most painful attention to detail, and released the result on his own label." Williams also says that Spector transformed rock music as a performing art into an art that could only exist in the recording studio, which "paved the way for art rock".

The Beach Boys' leader Brian Wilson is also cited as one of the first examples of the auteur music producer. Like Spector, Wilson was known as a reclusive studio obsessive who laboriously produced fantastical soundscapes through his
mastery of recording technology. Biographer Peter Ames Carlin wrote that Wilson was the forerunner of "a new kind of art-rock that would combine the transcendent possibilities of art with the mainstream accessibility of pop music". Drawing from the influence of Wilson's work and the work of the Beatles' producer George Martin, music producers after the mid 1960s began to view the recording studio as a musical instrument used to aid the process of composition. Critic Stephen Holden says that mid-1960s recordings by the Beatles, Spector and Wilson are often identified as marking the start of art pop, which preceded the "bombastic, classically inflected" art rock that started in the late 1960s.

Many of the top British groups during the 1960s – including members of the Beatles, the Rolling Stones, the Kinks, the Who, 10cc, the Move, the Yardbirds and Pink Floyd – came to music via art school. This institution differed from its US counterpart in terms of having a less industry-applicable syllabus and in its focus on furthering eccentric talent. By the mid-1960s, several of these acts espoused an approach based on art and originality, where previously they had been absorbed solely in authentic interpretation of US-derived musical styles, such as rock 'n' roll and R&B.

According to journalist Richard Goldstein, many popular musicians from California (like Wilson) desired to be acknowledged as artists, and struggled with this aspiration. Goldstein says that the line between violating musical conventions and making "truly popular music" caused those who did not have "strong enough egos" (in contrast to Bob Dylan and the Beatles) to be "doomed to a respectful rejection, and a few albums with disappointing sales usually meant silence. ... They yearned for fame, as only needy people can, but they also wanted to make art, and when both of those impulses couldn’t be achieved they recoiled in a ball of frantic confusion."

Author Matthew Bannister traces "the more self-conscious, camp aesthetic of art rock" to pop artist Andy Warhol and the Velvet Underground, who emulated Warhol's art/pop synthesis. Accordingly: "Warhol took Spector's combination of the disembodiment, 'distance' and refinement of high culture with the 'immediacy' of mass cultural forms like rock and roll several stages further ... But Warhol’s aesthetic was more thoroughly worked out than Spector's, which represented a transitional phase between old-fashioned auteurism and the thoroughly postmodern, detached tenets of pop art. ... Warhol's approach reverberates throughout art rock, most obviously in his stance of distance and disengagement." In 1969, the Doors also explored art rock genre on their fourth album, The Soft Parade.

Influential albums

1965–66
The December 1965 release of the Beatles' Rubber Soul signified a watershed for the pop album, transforming it in scope from a collection of singles with lesser-quality tracks to a distinct art form, filled with high-quality original compositions. The album garnered recognition for the Beatles as artists from the American mainstream press, anticipating rock music's cultural legitimization as an art form. Writing in 1968, Gene Sculatti of Jazz & Pop recognized Rubber Soul as "the definitive 'rock as art' album" and "the necessary prototype" that major artists such as the Rolling Stones (with Aftermath) and the Beach Boys had felt compelled to follow.

The period when rock music became most closely aligned with art began in 1966 and continued until the mid 1970s. Academic Michael Johnson associates "the first documented moments of ascension in rock music" to the Beach Boys' Pet Sounds and the Beatles' Sgt. Pepper's Lonely Hearts Club Band (1967). Released in May 1966, Pet Sounds came from Wilson's desire to make a "complete statement", as he believed the Beatles had previously done with Rubber Soul. In 1978, biographer David Leaf wrote that the album heralded art rock, while according to The New York Observer, "Pet Sounds proved that a pop group could make an album-length piece comparable with the greatest long-form works of Bernstein, Copland, Ives, and Rodgers and Hammerstein." Pet Sounds is also noted as the first rock concept album. In 1971, Cue magazine described the Beach Boys as having been "among the vanguard" with regard to art rock, among many other aspects relating to the counterculture, over the period up to late 1967.

Jacqueline Edmondson's 2013 encyclopedia Music in American Life states that, although it was preceded by earlier examples, Frank Zappa and the Mothers of Invention's debut album Freak Out! (June 1966) came to be seen as "the first successful incorporation of art music in a pop context". With Los Angeles as his base since the early 1960s, Zappa was able to work in an environment where student radicalism was closely aligned with an active avant-garde scene, a setting that placed the city ahead of other countercultural centres at the time and would continue to inform his music. Writer and pianist Michael Campbell comments that the album "contains a long noncategorical list of Zappa's influences, from classical avant-garde composers to obscure folk musicians".

The Beatles' Revolver (August 1966) furthered the album-as-art perspective and continued pop music's evolution. Led by the art-rock single "Eleanor Rigby", it expanded the genre's scope in terms of the range of musical styles, which included Indian, avant-garde and classical, and the lyrical content of the album, and also in its departure from previous notions of melody and structure in pop songwriting. According to Rolling Stone, "Revolver signaled that in popular music, anything – any theme, any musical idea – could now be realized." As with Rubber Soul, the album inspired many of the progressive rock artists of the 1970s, and each of its songs has been recognised as anticipating a new subgenre or style.

1967

Clash Music names the Velvet Underground's debut March 1967 album The Velvet Underground & Nico "the original art-rock record". Bannister writes of the Velvet Underground: "no other band exerted the same grip on the minds of 1970s/1980s art/alternative rock artists, writers and audiences." Their influence would recur from the 1970s onwards to various worldwide indie scenes, and in 2006, The Velvet Underground & Nico was inducted into the Library of Congress' National Recording Registry, who commented: "For decades [it] has cast a huge shadow over nearly every sub-variety of avant-garde rock, from 70s art-rock to no-wave, new-wave, and punk." However, when the Velvet Underground first appeared in the mid 1960s, they faced rejection and were commonly dismissed as a "fag" band. In 1982, musician Brian Eno famously stated that while The Velvet Underground & Nico initially sold just 30,000 copies, "everyone who bought one of those 30,000 copies started a band."

The Beatles' Paul McCartney deemed Pet Sounds "the record of the time", and in June 1967, the band responded with their own album: Sgt. Pepper's, which was also influenced by Freak Out! AllMusic states that the first wave of art rock musicians were inspired by Sgt. Pepper's and believed that for rock music to grow artistically, they should incorporate elements of European and classical music to the genre. Many British groups flowered in the album's wake; those who are listed in Music in American Life include the Moody Blues, the Strawbs, Genesis, and "most notably", Pink Floyd. The band's Roger Waters later stated that both Sgt. Pepper and Pet Sounds "completely changed everything about records" for him.

1970s–1990s

Art rock's greatest level of popularity was in the early 1970s through British artists including King Crimson and Queen.

Early in the decade, Pink Floyd released Atom Heart Mother, with the 23-minute title track taking up the entire first side of the LP. This experiment with collaborator Ron Geesin yielded the longest unbroken Pink Floyd song on record, a suite divided into six parts, which required the band at times to utilize a choir and brass section on tour. The album was a commercial success, giving the band to its first number one record in the UK. It signaled a shift in their music from the psychedelic forays of their late '60s albums and into a period of renewed creativity in the form of longer and more progressive rock music.

Enthusiasm for art rock explorations waned in the mid 1970s. From then to the 1990s, art rock was infused within various popular music genres. Encyclopædia Britannica states that its genre's tendencies were continued by some British and American hard rock and pop rock artists, and that Brian Eno's late 1970s and early 1980s collaborations with David Bowie and Talking Heads are exemplary of "the successful infusion of art rock tendencies into other popular music genres". Bowie and Eno collaborated on a series of consecutive albums called the "Berlin Trilogy", characterized as an "art rock trifecta" by Consequence of Sound, who noted that at the time of their release, "The experimental records weren’t connecting with audiences on the scale Bowie was used to. ... New Wave had exploded, and a generation of Bowie descendants had taken the stage."

In the 1980s, a new generation of English art rockers took the place of 1970s bands such as Roxy Music, Yes, Genesis, Jethro Tull and Emerson, Lake & Palmer. Journalist Roy Trakin says: "Of course, these stalwarts can still fill Madison Square Garden and sell a great many records, as they always have, but their days of adventurous risk-taking and musical innovation are long gone – replaced by the smug satisfaction of commercial success."

Notes

References

Bibliography

Further reading
 

 
British styles of music
Experimental rock
British rock music genres
American styles of music
American rock music genres
20th-century music genres
Pop art
Progressive rock
Progressive music
1960s in music
1970s in music
1980s in music
1990s in music